Patrick Farkas (born 9 September 1992) is an Austrian professional footballer who plays for TSV Hartberg.

Club career

FC Red Bull Salzburg 
After spending the entirety of his career with SV Mattersburg since his debut in 2009, Farkas joined Austrian giants Red Bull Salzburg in the summer of 2017 and signed a three-year contract.

In his first year at the club, Farkas made 16 league appearances and scored one goal as Salzburg won their fifth Austrian Football Bundesliga title in a row.

Following a lengthy time on the sidelines with a cruciate ligament injury, Farkas returned to the squad for the final of the 2018–19 Austrian Cup on 1 May 2019. He scored the opening goal before Mu'nas Dabbur headed in minutes later to make it 2–0. Farkas was dismissed early in the second half for a second yellow card, but Salzburg held on for the win and lifted the trophy to secure a domestic double.

2019–20 season 
On 19 July 2019, Farkas made his season debut in a match against Parndorf in the first round of the 2019–20 Austrian Cup; he scored two goals as Salzburg ran out 7–1 winners over the fourth division side.

Farkas made his debut appearance in the UEFA Champions League proper with a substitute appearance against Genk on 17 September; a match that Salzburg won 6–2.

On 23 December, it was reported that Farkas had suffered a stroke in training on 21 October. In a video posted to the club's social media channels, Farkas said that he collapsed due to a hole in his heart caused the stroke when a blood clot shot to his brain. He did not require surgery to close the hole and returned to training in late December with the goal of re-joining Salzburg's match-day squads by early 2020.

Hartberg
In January 2022, Farkas returned to Austria after 6 months in Switzerland and signed with TSV Hartberg until June 2024.

Career statistics

Honours 
Red Bull Salzburg
 Austrian Football Bundesliga: 2017–18, 2018–19, 2019–20, 2020–21
 Austrian Cup: 2018–19, 2019–20, 2020–21

References 

1992 births
Austrian people of Hungarian descent
Living people
Austrian footballers
Austria youth international footballers
Austria under-21 international footballers
Association football midfielders
SV Mattersburg players
FC Red Bull Salzburg players
FC Luzern players
TSV Hartberg players
Austrian Football Bundesliga players
2. Liga (Austria) players
Swiss Super League players
Austrian expatriate footballers
Expatriate footballers in Switzerland
Austrian expatriate sportspeople in Switzerland
People from Oberwart
Footballers from Burgenland